Talempong is a traditional music of the Minangkabau people of Western Sumatra, Indonesia. The talempong produce a static texture consisting of interlocking rhythms.

A talempong a small kettle gong which gives its name to an ensemble of four or five talempong as well as other gongs and drums. The term can refer to the instrument, the ensemble, or the genre of music. Talempong is in the form of a circle with a diameter of 15 to 17.5 centimeters, with a hollow hole at the bottom while at the top there is a roundabout with a diameter of five centimeters as a place to be hit. Talempong has a different tone. The sound is produced from a pair of wood hammered on its surface.

In 2019 and 2021, The Talempong Unggan and The Talempong Pakcik were recognized as National Intangible Cultural Heritage of Indonesia by the Indonesian Ministry of Education and Culture.

On December 15, 2021, UNESCO officially recognized Gamelan which includes a musical instrument of Talempong as a Masterpiece of the Oral and Intangible Heritage of Humanity, and encouraged the Indonesian people and the Indonesian government to safeguard, transmit, promote performances and to encourage the craftsmanship of the instruments.

Cultural contexts
Talempong is usually used to accompany dance or welcoming performances, such as the typical Tari Piring, Tari Pasambahan, Tari Alang, Tari Suntiang Pangulu and Tari Gelombang. Talempong is usually performed with an accordion accompaniment, a type of organ supported and played with the right hand played by the player. In addition to the accordion, instruments such as saluang, gandang, serunai and other traditional Minangkabau instruments are also commonly played with talempong.

Talempong can be used to play a wide variety of music traditional and modern. Talempong have been used in some experimental gamelan pieces composed at Sekolah Tinggi Seni Indonesia Surakarta, which has West Sumatran instructors and students.

Outside Indonesia
In Malaysia, the talempong was brought to  Negeri Sembilan, Peninsular Malaysia, in the 14th century by Minangkabau people from nearby West Sumatra. Here, talempong is also known as caklempong.

The caklempong is present in the different configurations of the Nobat, a ceremonial traditional orchestra that is among the Regalia of Malaysia. Performances by the Nobat are limited to royal occasions, the ensemble playing an important role in the Installation of the Yang di-Pertuan Agong.

Gallery

See also

 Gamelan - gong chime music of Java, Bali, southern Sumatra
 Kulintang - a single row kettle gong instrument of the southern Philippines, northern Borneo, Sulawesi.
 Bonang - kettle gong instrument of Java
History of Caklempong

Sources
Roth, A. R. New Compositions for Javanese Gamelan. University of Durham, Doctoral Thesis, 1986

Notes

Gong and chime music
Indonesian styles of music
Malaysian styles of music
Percussion ensembles
Gongs
Indonesian musical instruments
Malaysian musical instruments